Elmira High School, commonly referred to as EHS, is a high school in Elmira, New York, United States. It was one of two public high schools operated by the Elmira City School District serving Chemung County, alongside Elmira Free Academy, before the two merged into its current state in 2014.

The school has the honor to be recognized by the New York State Education Department as the only high performing school in the district, scoring the highest averages on state testing and curriculum exercises. Southside offers many special classes such as AP and ACE classes that could potentially count for future college credits. Aside from academics, Southside has been a strong contender in many different sports throughout the years, boasting an upgraded hall of fame in its gymnasium area. The high school is also involved in several different club opportunities, the top three being FBLA-PBL (Future Business Leaders of America), Key Club, and National Honor Society. All three are directly involved in community service. Some of these, with the addition of student council, assist in planning events such as Southside's annual Special Olympics program, the spirit week activities for what is now known as the "Express Fest," community service involvement, school functions such as managing program box offices and the school store, amongst other positive endeavors of the many clubs.

Southside and EFA
In its time of existence, which came shortly after EFA, Southside High had two different buildings in use. Currently, it is using a newly renovated building on South Main Street on Elmira's southside. Prior to the merger, its school colors had been green and white since the establishment of the high school as well as its sports teams, called the Green Hornets.

Until the 2011–2012 school year, Elmira Free Academy would play Southside High School in football for the Erie Bell, a trophy donated to the two schools by a local railroad company. In 2011, it was announced that the long-standing rivalry between the schools would come to an end and they would combine. The two high schools combined their sports teams by the 2011–12 school year. A community vote was taken to determine what new mascot and colors people were interested in. On May 25, 2011, the district officially announced that the new team would be called the Elmira Express, a common nickname for Elmiran legend Ernie Davis, the first African-American to ever win the Heisman Trophy in the sport of football. The team colors became red, black, and white.

The Decker Bell replaced the 64-year Erie Bell tradition. The new Elmira Express combined team has begun somewhat of a new rivalry with the Corning Hawks from two recently combined schools in Corning, New York. Both team combinations were due to severe budget issues that are still imminent and pose a threat to combine the schools altogether. The Elmira budget problem also jeopardizes the education of the students in the district, as well as the futures of the employed staff.

Principals
 Frank M. Edson (1924–1932)
 Clifford McNaught (1932–1952)
 Wallace Howell (1952–1955)
 Arnold Greene (1955–1966)
 Martin Harrigan (1966–1973)
 Jerome O'Dell (1973–1991)
 Kenneth Thomas (1991–1996)
 Daile Rose (1996–January 1999)
 Arline Ely (January 1999 – 2000)
 Lisa Kelly (2000–2003)
 Theresa Armstrong (interim, 2003)
 James Snyder (interim, 2004)
 Christopher Krantz (2004–2020)
 Christopher Reger (2020–present)

Notable alumni
 Kevin B. Winebold – musical director, actor

References

External links
Official site

Buildings and structures in Elmira, New York
Schools in Chemung County, New York
Public high schools in New York (state)
1924 establishments in New York (state)